Al Gore was the 45th vice president of the United States (1993–2001). He previously served as a United States senator (1985–1993) and United States representative (1977–1985) from Tennessee.

House of Representatives (1976–1982)

Senate (1984–1990)

Presidential elections (1988–2000)

See also

 Electoral history of Bill Clinton
 Electoral history of Hillary Clinton
 Electoral history of Barack Obama
 Electoral history of Joe Biden
 Electoral history of Kamala Harris
 Electoral history of Bernie Sanders

Notes

References 

Al Gore
Gore, Al